Jesper Manns (born 5 August 1995) is a Swedish footballer who plays as a right or left back for AFC Eskilstuna.

References

External links
 
  
 

1995 births
Living people
Association football goalkeepers
Jönköpings Södra IF players
IF Elfsborg players
Kalmar FF players
AFC Eskilstuna players
Swedish footballers
Superettan players
Allsvenskan players
Sweden under-21 international footballers
Sweden youth international footballers
Eskilstuna City FK players
People from Eskilstuna
Sportspeople from Södermanland County